The 2019 Clásica de Almería was the 34th edition of the Clásica de Almería road cycling one day race. It was held on 17 February 2019 as part of the UCI Europe Tour in category 1.HC.

Teams
Seventeen teams of up to seven riders started the race:

Result

References 

Clásica de Almería
Clásica de Almería
Clásica de Almería